Sabre Corporation is a travel technology company based in Southlake, Texas. It is the largest global distribution systems provider for air bookings in North America. American Airlines founded the company in 1960, and it was spun off in 2000.

In 2007, Texas Pacific Group and Silver Lake Partners acquired what was then Sabre Holdings. Sabre began publicly trading on the NASDAQ in 2014.

History

Early history
In 1953, C.R. Smith, the president of American Airlines, met Blair Smith, an IBM salesman, on a flight and developed the Sabre (the Semi-Automatic Business Research Environment) concept. The system was based on SAGE, the first major system to use interactive real-time computing, which IBM had developed for military use.

Sabre Corporation was founded in 1960 by American Airlines. Sabre Corporation installed the first Sabre reservation system in Briarcliff Manor, New York that year. The system consisted of two IBM 7090 mainframe computers and processed 84,000 calls per day.

In 1964, Sabre's nationwide network was completed and became the largest commercial real-time data-processing system in the world. Sabre Corporation handled 7500 passenger reservations per hour in 1965. The Sabre system upgraded to IBM System/360 and moved to a new center in Tulsa, Oklahoma in 1972.

In 1976, the Sabre system was installed into a travel agency for the first time. This allowed travel agents to have instant access to flights. By the end of the year, 130 locations installed the Sabre system. Sabre introduced BargainFinder, the industry's first automated low-fare search capability, in 1984. The following year, easySabre was launched. It gave consumers with personal computers access to the Sabre system to make airline, hotel and car rental reservations.

In 1989 The New York Times reported Sabre having "about 38 percent of the reservations market."

In 1996, the company launched Travelocity, an online travel agency. Sabre formed a joint venture with Abacus International in 1998 to create SabreSonic, a customized version of Sabre's reservations system to Abacus subscribers in Asia.

2000s
AMR Corporation, the parent company of American Airlines, spun off its controlling stake in Sabre Corporation in 2000 to form an independent company.

In 2001, Electronic Data Systems (EDS) purchased Sabre Holdings' airline hardware and communications business, and Sabre began migrating its old mainframe for air travel shopping and pricing to HP NonStop and Linux servers. In 2005, the company acquired lastminute.com, an online travel and leisure retailer.

Texas Pacific Group and Silver Lake Partners acquired Sabre Corporation in March 2007. In March 2010, the company acquired Calidris, a revenue integrity and business intelligence company. Sabre Corporation acquired SoftHotel, a web-based property management provider, in June 2011. The company launched Sabre Red App Centre in March 2012. In April 2014, Sabre Corporation went public on NASDAQ under the ticker symbol SABR. The IPO sold for $16 per share and valued Sabre at $3.93 billion. The company acquired Genares, a hospitality technology company, that September.

In December 2014, Bravofly Rumbo Group acquired Sabre European Online Travel Agency, lastminute.com.

In January 2015, Sabre sold its Travelocity brand to Expedia, Inc. for $280 million. In July 2015, Sabre acquired Abacus International, a global distribution system based in the Asia-Pacific region. The deal included long-term distribution agreements between Sabre and the 11 Asian airlines that previously shared ownership of Abacus.

In June 2016, Sabre announced Tom Klein would resign as CEO by the end of 2016.

In October 2019 Sabre announced its purchase of Radixx for $110.  Radixx is a seller of passenger service software to small and budget airlines.  Sabre expects Radixx to generate $20 million in 2019.

In October 2021, Sabre announced the sale of the AirCentre portfolio to CAE Inc for $392.5M.

In May 2022 Sabre announced its purchase of Nuvola, a provider of hotel and service optimization software.

In August 2022, Sabre acquired Conferma Pay, a UK-based payments company.

In March 2023, Sabre announced some executive changes as part of what it called its "long-term succession plan." The changes include Sean Menke transitioning to be solely Executive Chair effective April 27. At the same time, Kurt Ekert, who served as the president of Sabre, will take over as CEO.

Operations
The company is based in Southlake, Texas and has additional offices in London, Kraków, Bangalore, Montevideo and Singapore. In December 2013, the company handled approximately 85,000 data transactions, every second for customers according to the Fort Worth Star-Telegram. At the time, the company did business with 70 airlines and 100,000 hotels. Sabre has two major business verticals - Sabre Travel Solutions and Sabre Hospitality Solutions.

Acquisitions
 Preview Travel (2000)
 Dillion Communication Systems (2000)
 Gradient Solutions (2000)
 GetThere (2000)
 Sabre Pacific (2001)
 Nexion Inc. (2003)
 David R. Bornemann Associates (2001)
 Site59 (2001)
 Resfeber Scandinavia (2002)
 Kiehl Hendrickson Group (2002)
 axsResource Airport Resource Management Solutions (2003)
 World Choice Travel (2003) 
 RM Rocade (2004) 
 Showtickets.com (2004)
 SynXis Corporation (2004)
 Southwest Travel Systems (2005)
 IgoUgo.com (2005)
 Lastminute.com (2005)
 E-site Marketing (2007)
 Flight Explorer (2008)
 EB2 (2008)  
 Calidris (2010) 
 Flightline Data Services (2010) 
 f:wz (2010)
SoftHotel (2011)
 Prism (2012)
 Genares (2014) 
Abacus International (2015)
Trust International (2015)
Airpas Aviation (2016)

References

Computer reservation systems
Travel technology
American companies established in 1960
Travel and holiday companies of the United States
Technology companies established in 1960
Hospitality companies established in 1960
Companies based in the Dallas–Fort Worth metroplex
Tarrant County, Texas
Corporate spin-offs
Companies listed on the Nasdaq
2014 initial public offerings
2007 mergers and acquisitions